Deadwood is a ghost town in Trinity County, California.

Namesake
Deadwood was named from adjacent forests of dead timber.

History
The former town started around 1851 and lasted till the post office was closed in 1915. The post office was open from 1881 to 1915.  

In 1880 The brown bear mine was established in Deadwood.

See also
List of ghost towns in California
Trinity County, California

References

Former populated places in Trinity County, California
Ghost towns in California